Vismayam is a 1998 Indian Malayalam film, directed by Raghunath Paleri and produced by CC Cine Vision. The film stars Dileep, Innocent, Sreedurga, and K. P. A. C. Lalitha in lead roles. It features music composed by Johnson. This film is the first in Malayalam to have a magical realism element in narration.

Cast
Dileep as Dinakaran
Sreedurga as Chinnammini/Rugmini
Innocent as Narayanan Master
Manka Mahesh as Ammini
Sreenivasan as Sahadevan
Jose Pellissery as Kochukrishnan
Amitha Sebastian as Radha
K. P. A. C. Lalitha as Kochammini
Cochin Haneefa as Janardhana Kurup
Rajan P Dev as Thumbaseery Kurup
Mukundan as Chandrappan
Oduvil Unnikrishnan as Adhikari
Kozhikode Narayanan Nair as Chinna Kurup
Zeenath as Valsala
Jagathy Sreekumar as S.I Muhamed Paraykkal
Spadikam George as D.S.P Ambujaksha kurup
Bindu Panicker as Sathyabhama
Kochu Preman as Kurup
Kunjandi as Shankaran Mesthari

Soundtrack
The music was composed by Johnson and lyrics was written by S. Ramesan Nair and Raghunath Paleri.

References

External links
 

1998 films
1990s Malayalam-language films